Tepuihyla, commonly known as Amazon tree frogs or Tepui tree frogs, is a genus of frogs in the family Hylidae found in mountains of eastern and south-eastern Venezuela and Guyana, and likely in adjacent Brazil.  A tepui is a table-top mountain characteristic of the Guiana Highlands.

Species
The following species are recognised in the genus Tepuihyla:

References

External links
  [web application]. 2008. Berkeley, California: Tepuihyla. AmphibiaWeb, available at http://amphibiaweb.org/. (Accessed: Apr 25, 2008). 
  taxon Tepuihyla at http://www.eol.org.
  Taxon Tepuihyla at https://www.itis.gov/index.html. (Accessed: Apr 25, 2008).
  Taxon Tepuihyla at http://data.gbif.org/welcome.htm

 
Hylidae
Amphibians of South America
Amphibian genera
Taxa named by Josefa Celsa Señaris
Amphibians of the Tepuis